McClurg Building may refer to:

McClurg Building (Chicago, Illinois), listed on the National Register of Historic Places in Cook County, Illinois
McClurg Building (Racine, Wisconsin), listed on the National Register of Historic Places in Racine County, Wisconsin